A by-election was held for the New South Wales Legislative Assembly seat of Marrickville on 22 October 1983. It was triggered by the death of Tom Cahill.

The Marrickville by-election was held the same day as the by-elections for Kogarah, Maroubra and Riverstone. All were safe Labor seats and while there was a swing against Labor in each seat (7.2% to 11.8%), all were retained by Labor.

Dates

Result 

	

Tom Cahill died.

See also
Electoral results for the district of Marrickville
List of New South Wales state by-elections

References 

1983 elections in Australia
New South Wales state by-elections
1980s in New South Wales
October 1983 events in Australia